Queen Divas (literally "Meet the Daughters-in-law"), is a Hong Kong modern comedy serial produced by TVB.

Synopsis
Ho Siu Lan (Nancy Sit) who is raised in a scholarly family, is not only good at housekeeping but also helps keep her husband Lin Lung (Yu Yeung) business running. Both her eldest son, Lin Chi Sam (Evergreen Mak) and youngest son Lin Chi Kit (Pierre Ngo) have yet to marry but developed an "underground" relationship with two of the most popular actresses. Siu Lan accepts them into the family reluctantly. Eldest daughter-in-law, Kwok Fei Fei (Joyce Tang) is known as the "queen of tragedy" in the industry whereas youngest daughter-in-law Man Choi Ling (Angela Tong) is dubbed as the "queen of comedy". A series of stories filled with tears and laughter will unfold within this family.

Cast
Nancy Sit as Ho Siu Lan (何少蘭), Lin Lung's wife, Lin Chi kit's and Lin Chi Sam's mother.
Joyce Tang as Kwok Fei Fei （郭菲菲）Lin Chi Sam's wife, Man Choi Ling's rival, Ho Siu Lan's and Lin Lung's daughter-in-law.
Evergreen Mak as Lin Chi Sam （連祉森）Lin Chi Kit's brother, Ho Siu Lan's son and Kwok Fei Fei's husband.
Angela Tong as Man Choi Ling （文彩菱）Lin Chi Kit's wife, Kwok Fei Fei's rival, Ho Siu Lan's and Lin Lung's daughter-in-law.
Pierre Ngo as Lin Chi Kit （連祉傑）Lin Chi Sam's brother, Ho Siu Lan's son, and Ma Choi Ling's husband.
Yu Yeung as Lin Lung （連龍）, Ho Siu Lan's husband, Lin Chi Kit's and Lin Chi Sam's father.
Yuen Qiu as Wong Lin Hing (黃蓮卿)
Anderson Junior as Lin Hung (連熊)
Hebe Chan as Lin Chi Yung (連祉融)
Rosanne Liu Juk Hoi Gwan (祝凱君)

Viewership ratings

References

External links
Official Website
K for TVB
English synopsis

TVB dramas
2014 Hong Kong television series debuts
2014 Hong Kong television series endings